Michigan's 28th Senate district is one of 38 districts in the Michigan Senate. The 28th district was created by the 1850 Michigan Constitution, as the 1835 constitution only permitted a maximum of eight senate districts. It has been represented by Democratic Samir Singh since 2023, succeeding Republican Mark Huizenga.

Geography
District 28 encompasses parts of Clinton, Ingham, and Shiawassee counties.

2011 Apportionment Plan
District 28, as dictated by the 2011 Apportionment Plan, covered the suburbs of Grand Rapids in Kent County, including the communities of Wyoming, Walker, Grandville, Rockford, Cedar Springs, Plainfield Township, Byron Township, Alpine Township, Algoma Township, Cannon Township, and Sparta Township.

The district was split between Michigan's 2nd and 3rd congressional districts, and overlapped with the 73rd, 74th, 77th, and 86th districts of the Michigan House of Representatives.

List of senators

Recent election results

2021

2018

2014

Federal and statewide results in District 28

Historical district boundaries

References 

28
Kent County, Michigan